The Philippine Registry of Cultural Property, abbreviated as PRECUP is a national registry of the Philippine Government used to consolidate in one record all cultural property that are deemed important to the cultural heritage, tangible and intangible, of the Philippines. On June 11, 2018, the entries in the newly updated PRECUP was at 3,921. Additionally, 1,259 out of 1,715 LGUs (provincial, municipal/city-levels), or 73 percent of LGUs have established local cultural inventories (LCI).

Establishment
This registry was established by the National Cultural Heritage Act of 2009 (Republic Act No. 10066) Section 14 which says "All cultural property of the country deemed important to cultural heritage shall be registered in the Philippine Registry of Cultural Property."

Implementation
The National Commission for Culture and the Arts is mandated to establish and maintain the registry, through the appropriate cultural agencies and local government units, within three years from the effectivity of the act. As stated in Section 14 of said legislation, the guidelines in the registration of cultural property are as follows:

Issue on ownership
It was clarified that by its enactment, Republic Act No. 10066 does not transfer ownership of the properties, identified as part of the Philippines' cultural heritage, to the state.

Contents
The highest cultural properties under the PRECUP are UNESCO inscriptions, followed by National Cultural Treasures and Important Cultural Properties. In resolution 2017-330 released on December 19, 2017, entitled "Guidelines governing PRECUP", the properties that can be included in the PRECUP are as follow:

Grade I level properties including:
World Heritage Sites as inscribed by the United Nations Educational, Scientific, and Cultural Organization (UNESCO)
National Cultural Treasures or unique cultural property found locally which has outstanding historical, cultural, artistic, and/or scientific value. It is highly significant and important to the country and is officially declared by the National Museum, the National Library, and the National Archive
Archaeological and traditional ethnographic materials with outstanding historical, cultural, artistic, and/or scientific value which is nationally significant and important to the nation, and officially declared as such by the National Museum
Filipiniana materials (or the basis for such) as officially declared by the National Library, that satisfy all of the following criteria:
Unique and outstanding representation of Philippine history, culture, and/or literature
First of its kind in the Philippines
One of ten (or fewer) known copies around the world
Possessed demonstrable evidence of historical, literary, and/or cultural significance, as seen in multiple printings, editions, translations, and/or adaptations in various formats over a period of at least four decades
National Historical Landmarks or sites or structures that are associated with events or achievements significant to Philippine history as declared by the National Historical Commission of the Philippines (NHCP)
National Historical Shrines or cultural property which are hallowed and revered for their history or association as declared by the NHCP
National Historical Monuments or structures that honor illustrious persons or commemorate events of historical value as declared by the NHCP
Heritage Houses as declared by the NHCP
Heritage Zones as declared by the National Museum and/or the NHCP in consultation with the National Commission for Culture and the Arts (NCCA) and the Housing and Land Use Regulatory Board or other concerned agencies
Grade II level or Important Cultural Properties (ICPs) including:
Important Cultural Properties  or cultural properties having exceptional cultural, artistic, and historical significance to the Philippines as declared by the National Museum, the National Library, and the National Archives
Filipiniana materials (or the basis for such) as officially declared by the National Library
Created by a National Artist or a national hero
Such that satisfy all the following criteria:
Unique or outstanding representation of Philippine history, culture, and/or literature
One of one hundred (or fewer) known copies around the world (may include first editions)
Possesses demonstrable evidence of historical, literary, and/or cultural significance, as seen in multiple printings, editions, translations, and/or adaptations in various formats over a period of at least two decades
Works by Manlilika ng Bayan awardees unless declared by the appropriate cultural agencies, or its presumption removed by the NCCA
Works by National Artists unless declared by the appropriate cultural agencies, or its presumption removed by the NCCA
All archaeological, traditional, ethnographic materials, unless declared or its presumption removed by the NCCA
Archaeological materials dated back to Paleolithic, Neolithic, and Metal periods
Archaeological materials attributed to the Tang, Five, and Yuan Dynasties
Archaeological materials attributed to the Song, Ming, and Ching Dynasties; and other archaeological materials from other countries with exceptional cultural, artistic, and historical significance to the Philippines, as determined by the National Museum
Ethnographic materials that are at least 100 years old from date of collection, with cultural significance and extensive documentation
All sites and structures bearing historical markers installed by the NHCP and its predecessors
Classified Historic Structures, covering all heritage churches and houses of worship before the year 1940, as declared by the NCHP
Archival materials or documents at least 50 years old unless declared or its presumption removed by the NCCA
Rare books, special collections, and incunabula unless declared of its presumption removed by the National Library
All holotypes of fossils, plants, and animals
Structures dating at least 50 years old
Archival material/document dating at least 50 years old
Grade III level or Cultural Properties (CPs). These are all other cultural properties not declared as Grades I or II
Archaeological materials not classified as Grades I or II that have been listed by the National Museum
Ethnographic materials that are at least 50 years old from the date of collection, with cultural significance and proper documentation
All other Filipiniana materials not classified as Grades I or II  as declared  by the National Library
Uncategorized Property not falling under the presumption of Important Cultural Property but contains characteristics that will qualify as such
Local Cultural Properties or cultural properties which are significant to local culture and history as declared by the Sanggunian or Legislative Assembly
Regional Cultural Property as designated by an ordinance of the Regional Legislative Assembly
Provincial Cultural Property as designated by an ordinance of the Sangguniang Panlalawigan
City Cultural Property as designated by an ordinance of the Sangguniang Panlungsod
Municipal Cultural Property as designated by an ordinance of the Sangguniang Bayan
Barangay Cultural Property as designated by an ordinance of the Sangguniang Banrangay
Lists of Intangible Cultural Heritage as inscribed by the UNESCO
Intangible cultural heritage elements, under the Philippine Inventory of Intangible Cultural Heritage (PIICH), in one or more of the 5 domains provided by UNESCO:
(1) Oral traditions and expressions, including language as a vehicle of Intangible cultural heritage
(2) Performing arts
(3) Social practices, rituals, and festive events
(4) Knowledge and practices concerning nature and the universe
(5) Traditional craftsmanship

Registration by LGU
Cultural properties are registered through the combined effort of Cultural Agencies including the National Museum, the National Historical Commission of the Philippines, the National Archives, and the National Library of the Philippines as well as of Local Government Units (LGUs). They shall work together in updating the PRECUP.

All cultural agencies shall individually maintain an inventory, evaluation and documentation of all cultural properties declared according to their category and shall submit the same to the commission.
Local government units, through their cultural offices, shall likewise maintain an inventory of cultural property under its jurisdiction and shall furnish the commission a copy of the same;
All government agencies and instrumentalities, government-owned and/or controlled corporations and their subsidiaries, including public and private educational institutions, report their ownership and/or possession of such items to the pertinent cultural agency.
Private collectors and owners shall register their cultural property to the National Museum. Registered cultural properties shall remain in the possession of their private owners.

See also
 List of World Heritage Sites in the Philippines
 List of Memory of the World (Documentary) Heritage of the Philippines
 List of National Cultural Treasures in the Philippines
Philippines National Historical Landmarks
 Important Cultural Property (Philippines)
 Intangible Cultural Heritage of the Philippines
 Historical markers of the Philippines
 Lists of Cultural Properties of the Philippines
 List of National Living Treasures (Gawad ng Manlilika) of the Philippines
 List of National Artists of the Philippines
 Ancestral houses of the Philippines
 National Cultural Heritage Act
 Tourism in the Philippines
 Dambana
 Suyat

References

External links

Philippine Registry of Cultural Property
National Registry of Historic Sites and Structures of the Philippines

 01
Heritage registers in the Philippines
Historic preservation in the Philippines
Heritage organizations

Historic preservation organizations in the Philippines